Nattilik Heritage Centre is a museum in Gjoa Haven, King William Island, Nunavut, Canada. It presents the history and culture of the local Inuit.

Franklin's lost expedition 

See also
 List of museums in Canada

References

External links

Museums in Nunavut
Gjoa Haven
Museums established in 2013
2013 establishments in Nunavut